Vexillum (Pusia) multicostatum is a species of small sea snail, marine gastropod mollusk in the family Costellariidae, the ribbed miters.

Description

Distribution

References

 Sheppard, A (1984). The molluscan fauna of Chagos (Indian Ocean) and an analysis of its broad distribution patterns. Coral Reefs 3: 43–50
 Turner H. 2001. Katalog der Familie Costellariidae Macdonald, 1860. Conchbooks. 1–100 page(s): 46

External links

multicostatum
Gastropods described in 1836
Taxa named by William Broderip